Mary Jane Christie Serrano (c. 1840 – 1923)  was a writer, poet and considered one of the best known translators in the United States.

Life
Born Mary Jane Christie in Castlebar, Ireland c. 1840 to Thomas Christie & Jane Bourns, she married Spaniard Juan Emigdio Serrano and emigrated to South America with him. There, she was a minister in the government and brother of the President of Colombia, José María Campo Serrano as well a relative of Carlos Holguin. She lived there for many years, also spending significant time in New York city as a result of his work. She learned to speak fluent Spanish. As a result of her proficiency, when her husband died she began to translate works into English. Serrano also translated from French and Portuguese. Her first translation was of Juan Valera whom she met in Washington D.C. while he was minister to the United States from Spain. The family were considered socialites due to their connections to the Spanish royal family and other government representatives. Serrano was considered a well known authority on Spanish literature and was appointed Judge of awards in the Spanish Literary and Educations Departments of the Columbian Exposition by the Spanish Government.

Personal life
Because of her husband's family and work the Serrano's were well connected. In 1894, Serrano took her daughter to Europe, visiting Spain where both were received by the Queen Regent returned with delightful recollections of the young king and princesses. Serrano had three children with her husband:
 Mariguita Serrano Villard, (1864–1936) whose mother-in-law was the activist Fanny Garrison Villard, co-founder of the NAACP. Her son was writer and diplomat Henry Serrano Villard
 Camilla Serrano Keating, (–1920)
 Vincent Serrano, (1866–1935) stage and film star.

Serrano died in her home in New York on 1 July 1923.

Selected works

References

External links
 

1840s births
1923 deaths
People from Castlebar
American translators
Translators of Émile Zola
American writers
Irish writers